Whetnall is a surname. Notable people with the surname include:

 Edith Whetnall (1910–1965), ear, nose, and throat surgeon
 Elsie Whetnall (1897– 1998), British philosopher
 Paul Whetnall (1947–2014), English badminton player, husband of Susan
 Susan Whetnall (born 1942), English badminton player